Beyond All Sense is Destiny's debut album. It was released in March 1985 on vinyl only.

Destiny re-recorded the entire album twenty years later as Beyond All Sense 2005.

Track listing
"Intro - Destiny"  – 1:33
"Rest In Peace"  – 4:25
"Spellbreaker"  – 4:52
"Hang Them High"  – 2:34
"Sirens In The Dark"  – 4:58
"Kill The Witch"  – 3:57
"Lost To Heaven (instrumental)"  – 1:46
"More Evil Than Evil"  – 3:42
"Power by Birth"  – 4:35
"Sacrilege"  – 4:46

Lineup 
Vocals: Håkan Ring
Guitar: John Prodén
Guitar: Magnus Österman
Bass: Stefan Björnshög
Drums: Peter Lundgren

1985 debut albums
Destiny (band) albums